Benigno Chaparro Vera (born 3 April 1958) is a Paraguayan retired professional footballer who played for a number of clubs in Spain, including UD Salamanca, Palencia CF, Racing de Santander, Deportivo Alavés, Orihuela Deportiva and CA Marbella.

External links
  
 Player profile at PlayerHistory.com
 

1958 births
Living people
People from Itauguá
Paraguayan footballers
UD Salamanca players
Racing de Santander players
Deportivo Alavés players
Orihuela Deportiva CF footballers
CA Marbella footballers
Association football forwards
Palencia CF players